Sangu language may refer to:
 Sangu language (Gabon) of Gabon (also spelled Chango, Isangu, Shango, Yisangou, and Yisangu)
 Sangu language (Tanzania) of Tanzania (also spelled Eshisango, Kisangu, Rori, Sangu, Sango)